San José de Flores is a station on Line A of the Buenos Aires Underground. The station connects with Flores station on the Sarmiento Line commuter rail service. The station was opened on 27 September 2013 as part of the extension of the line from Carabobo to San Pedrito.

References

External links

Buenos Aires Underground stations
2013 establishments in Argentina
Railway stations opened in 2013